List of incidents in Australia where an organised group, or an individual claiming an association with such a group, attempts or plans an act of violence targeting innocents.

References

Australia
Terroristincidents
terrorist incidents
Terrorist incidents